Nathanael Isaac E. Saleh is an English actor best known for playing John Banks in Mary Poppins Returns. He also has a key role in 'Letter for the King', in which he plays Piak.

Early life

Saleh started performing when he was three year old, singing songs and giving recitations to family and friends. At five years old he followed older brother to join Playbox Theatre at the Dream Factory in Warwick, England, gaining his first speaking role just a year later. This was followed over subsequent years by roles in a number of Playbox Theatre productions. At the beginning of 2015 he signed up at The Book, Playbox Theatre's own in-house agency, and almost immediately began receiving calls for auditions. Nathanael has always had an interest in dance, gaining a series of IDTA qualifications in Ballet and in Contemporary Dance. He has also worked on developing his range in acting, specifically in Voice Training, successfully completing LAMDA examinations in "Speaking Verse & Prose" up to Grade 3 at present, all with distinction.

Career
He began acting in television roles. In 2016 he appeared on two episodes of Game of Thrones. In 2018 he made his film debut in the film Mary Poppins Returns, he plays John Banks, Michael's eldest son and Jane's nephew. 

Most recently Nathanael has played Azolan in Dangerous Liaisons.

Filmography

Film

Television

Awards and nominations

References

External links

Living people
British male film actors
2006 births